Phytoecia adusta is a species of beetle in the family Cerambycidae. It was described by Reitter in 1889. It is known from Armenia.

References

Phytoecia
Beetles described in 1889